Princess Hyohoe (Hangul: 효회공주, Hanja: 孝懷公主; 1183–1199) or posthumously called Princess Heungdeok was a Goryeo Royal Princess as the first and oldest daughter of King Sinjong and Queen Seonjeong who was born when her father was still a Duke Pyeongnyang (평량공). She was the first younger sister of King Huijong and Duke Yangyang.

She later married Wang-Chun (왕춘) who was the descendant of Wang-Gi, Duke Pyeongyang (왕기 평양공), the son of Hyeonjong of Goryeo and then given a title as Duke Hawon (하원공). However, she later died in 1199 when she was 17 years old. Her death was make her parents very sad about this. In the other hand, after her death, her husband, Wang-Chun was remarried again with Princess Suryeong (수령궁주), the only daughter of King Gangjong.

Family
Father: Sinjong of Goryeo (고려 신종; 1144–1204)
Grandfather: Injong of Goryeo (고려 인종; 1109–1146)
Grandmother: Queen Gongye (공예왕후; 1109–1183)
Mother: Queen Seonjeong (선정왕후; d. 1222)
Grandfather: Wang-On, Duke Gangneung (왕온 강릉공; d. 1146)
Grandmother: Lady Gim (부인 김씨)
Older brother: Huijong of Goryeo (고려 희종; 1181–1237)
Older brother: Wang Seo, Duke Yangyang (왕서 양양공)
Younger sister: Princess Gyeongnyeong (경녕궁주)
Husband: Wang-Chun, Duke Hawon (왕춘 하원공); son of Wang-Won, Marquess Gyeseong (왕원 계성후).

References

1183 births
1199 deaths
Goryeo princesses
12th-century Korean women
12th-century Korean people